Dimitris Sgouros (born 30 August 1969) is a Greek classical pianist. Widely acclaimed for his prodigious musical talent as a boy, Sgouros is one of the world's leading concert pianists.Arthur Rubinstein remarked that he had produced "the best playing I have ever heard;"

Biography
Sgouros was the son of Sotirios and Marianthi Sgouros. There was no notable record of musical talent in his family. He began playing the piano when he was six-years old and gave his first public performance a year later. At the age of eight, he entered the Athens Conservatoire, studying under Maria Herogiorgiou-Sigara. Sgouros won several competitions between 1978 and 1983, including the UNICEF competition in Bulgaria (1979), a competition in Ancona, Italy (1980), and two competitions in his home city of Athens. He was also the recipient of the 1982 Leonardo da Vinci International Award.

In 1982, at the age of 12, Sgouros made his Carnegie Hall debut. He performed Rachmaninoff's Piano Concerto No. 3 with the National Symphony Orchestra, conducted by Mstislav Rostropovich. In mid-1983, before he had turned 13, Sgouros graduated from the conservatory with a professor's diploma, teacher's diploma, first prize, and a gold medal. Sgouros continued his studies at the Royal Academy of Music of London and the University of Maryland, College Park, in the United States of America. He graduated from Royal Academy with the highest marks the institution had ever awarded. Besides his musical talents, Sgouros has undertaken postgraduate studies in mathematics at the University of Oxford.

Performances around the world have included concerts in Australia, Austria, Bulgaria, China, Cyprus, France, Germany, Hong Kong, Israel, Italy, Japan, Korea, New Zealand, Romania, Russia, South Africa, Spain, and Turkey. Sgouros has performed for the royal families of Britain, Monaco, and Sweden, and played under the baton of renowned conductors such as Herbert von Karajan, Leonard Bernstein, Emil Tabakov, Kurt Masur, and Yevgeny Svetlanov. He has recorded for various record labels, including Dino Music and EMI. Since March 1988, three Sgouros Festivals have been instituted, in Hamburg, Ljubljana, and Singapore.

Sgouros has featured prominently in the media, having appeared on NBC's The Tonight Show Starring Johnny Carson and a television concert with Chopin's 1st Piano Concerto. He has also been profiled by Oscar-winning director François Reichenbach in a feature-length documentary film.

See also
 List of classical pianists
 List of classical pianists (recorded)
 List of music prodigies

Notes

a.  Sgouros's name sometimes appears as Dimitrios Sgouros.

References

Citations

Bibliography
Tarallo, Alfredo (1993). "Sgouros, Poet of the Piano." Il Mattino. 26 July.
Klement, Udo (1991). "Fascinating Sgouros: Gewandhaus Orchestra with pianist Dimitris Sgouros." Leipziger Volkszeitung
Ardoin, John (1989). "Pianist Sgouros is an Old Master at 19." Dallas Morning News. 12 January.
Crutchfield, Will (1988). "Review/Concert; Young American Choruses." New York Times. April 21.
Ardoin, John (1987). "Sgouros Proves Electrifying – Pianist Plays Brilliantly with FW Symphony." Dallas Morning News. 20 October.
Guenther, Roy (1985). "Dimitris Sgouros: Flash Without Feeling." Washington Post. 17 July.
Rosenberg, Donald (1984). "A Gifted Pianist Who Is Not Yet 15." Philadelphia Inquirer. 27 July.
Finn, Robert (1984). "Young Greek Pianist Does Amazingly Well on Mozart." Cleveland Plain Dealer. 15 July.
Mclellan, Joseph (1984). "Dimitris Sgouros: Coming of Age." Washington Post. 9 July.
Mclellan, Joseph (1982). "Dimitris Sgouros' Promising Piano." Washington Post. 19 July.
Mclellan, Joseph (1982). "Pianist's Return." Washington Post. 23 April.
Mclellan, Joseph (1982). "Bravo Sgouros." Washington Post. 16 April.
Thomas, R. M. (1982). "Boy Vs. Rachmaninoff." The New York Times. 15 April.

External links
 Classical Pianist Dimitris Sgouros
 Free video and mp3 downloads of Dimitris Sgouros' playing

 

Living people
1969 births
Greek classical pianists
Musicians from Athens
21st-century classical pianists